Jonathan Aaron is an American poet, the author of the poetry collection Journey to the Lost City.

Life
He graduated from the University of Chicago and Yale University Ph.D.

His work has been  published in The Paris Review, Ploughshares, The New Yorker, The New York Review of Books, The London Review of books, The Boston Globe (as guest reviewer), and The Times Literary Supplement.

Aaron was born and raised in Massachusetts. He currently lives in Cambridge, Massachusetts.  Since 1988, Mr. Aaron has been an Associate Professor at Emerson College in the Department of Writing, Literature and Publishing. In Fall of 2007, Mr. Aaron was visiting poet-in-residence at Williams College.

Awards
He received the 1975-1976 Amy Lowell Poetry Travelling Scholarship.
His work has received many honors, including Fellowships from Yaddo, MacDowell, and the Massachusetts Endowment for the Arts.
His poems have appeared in Best American Poetry'' five times.

Works
 "The End of Out of the Past", pō’ĭ-trē

Poetry books

Translation

Anthology

Reviews
“Dreaming is after all a kind of thinking,” Jonathan Aaron writes in this new volume, his third in almost 25 years, and it’s hard to imagine a more succinct statement of his poetic method. Aaron has always used the peculiar instability of poems to his advantage: he builds tension from a poem’s ability to slip on no more than a phrase from the real to the symbolic, from the hypothetical to the unalterable.

References

Living people
University of Chicago alumni
Emerson College faculty
Poets from Massachusetts
1941 births
Yale Graduate School of Arts and Sciences alumni